Bell Valley is a small, mainly ice-free valley lying south of Urban Point in the Enterprise Hills, Heritage Range. It was named by the University of Minnesota geological party after the Bell helicopters used by the party in the exploration of the area in 1963–64.

References
 

Valleys of Antarctica
Landforms of Ellsworth Land